The Honda RA273 was a Formula One racing car used by the Honda team in the 1966 and 1967 Formula One seasons.

The engine was re-designed from the RA272's 1,500cc V12 to a brand new 3,000cc V12 due to the change of regulations before the 1966 season. The new engine was designed by Shoichiro Irimajiri.

Formula One World Championship results
(key) (Races in italics indicate fastest lap)

 Only 8 of the 20 points were scored with the Honda RA273; the remainder were scored with the Honda RA300

Non-Championship Formula One results
(key)

External links 

 Honda RA273: Restoration story - Honda Collection Hall "From Restoration Room"
 Report: Driving the restored RA273 - report by Hikaru Miyagi

Honda Formula One cars